A variety of parasites have been recorded from the marsh rice rat (Oryzomys palustris), a semiaquatic rodent found in the eastern and southern United States, north to New Jersey and Kansas and south to Florida and Texas, and in Tamaulipas, far northeastern Mexico. Some of these parasites are endoparasites, internal parasites, while others are ectoparasites, external parasites.

Parasitologist John Kinsella compared the endoparasites of marsh rice rats in a saltwater marsh at Cedar Key and a freshwater marsh at Paynes Prairie, both in Florida, in a 1988 study. He found a total of 45 species, a number unequaled in rodents. This may be related to the diverse habitats the rice rat uses and to its omnivorous diet; it eats a variety of animals which may serve as intermediate hosts of various parasites. The endoparasites in the saltwater marsh were dominated by trematodes (flukes), and those of the freshwater marsh by nematodes (roundworms). Endoparasites were found in the gastric mucosa (which lines the stomach), the cavity of the stomach, the small intestine, the cecum, the large intestine, the pancreatic duct, the bile ducts, the mucus of the liver, the pulmonary arteries, the abdominal cavity, and the pleural cavity. While the marsh rice rat harbors a number of host-specific species, such as the nematode Aonchotheca forresteri, other parasite species, such as the lone star tick (pictured), are shared with other mammals. Compared to the hispid cotton rat (Sigmodon hispidus), Florida marsh rice rats usually harbor fewer individual ectoparasites of each species. Borrelia, the bacterium that causes Lyme disease, has been identified in some ticks that infect the marsh rice rat and it has been identified as a possible natural reservoir for Borrelia.

Key

Ectoparasites

Acari
The Acari include the mites and ticks.  Many are parasites of other animals. One study in South Carolina failed to find ticks on marsh rice rats living in marshes, which are an unsuitable habitat for the parasites.

Anoplura
Sucking lice (Anoplura) are a diverse group infecting placental mammals. Species found on marsh rice rats include three of the common genus Hoplopleura and Polyplax spinulosa, which more usually infects black and brown rats.

Siphonaptera
Fleas (Siphonaptera) are common parasites of vertebrates, mainly mammals. Several species of fleas have been found on the marsh rice rat.

Endoparasites
Unless otherwise specified, all information in this section is from Kinsella (1988, table 1).

Nematoda
Nematodes are among the largest animal phyla and include at least 12,000 known species that are parasites of vertebrates. In Kinsella's 1988 study in Florida, species diversity was higher in the saltwater marsh (Cedar Key) than the freshwater marsh (Paynes Prairie), but nematodes at Paynes Prairie occurred more commonly and made up the bulk of the parasites found in rice rats there.

Cestoda
Four tapeworms are known from the marsh rice rat, all in Florida, but three of those are usually found in other species and only rarely in the rice rat.

Digenea
Flukes (Trematoda) from the subclass Digenea are common parasites of small mammals with complex life cycles. In his 1988 study, Kinsella found an unprecedented 21 species of trematodes in Florida marsh rice rats. The intermediate hosts of these trematodes include a variety of invertebrates, fish, and amphibians, which are eaten by the marsh rice rat. Trematodes were generally more common at the Cedar Key saltwater marsh than at the freshwater marsh in Paynes Prairie.

Pentastomida
Pentastomida is an enigmatic group of parasites that may be related to maxillopod crustaceans. One species, Porocephalus crotali, is known from the marsh rice rat. It infects various mammals in the southeastern United States, which serve as intermediate hosts; snakes which eat those mammals are the definitive hosts.

Apicomplexa
Apicomplexa is a major group of unicellular eukaryotes that encompasses several important parasites, including the malaria parasite Plasmodium. Three species are known from the marsh rice rat, all of which belong to the Eimerina clade. Two are in the genus Eimeria, members of which cause the economically significant disease coccidiosis in poultry. The third is a member of Isospora, which includes species that are pathogenic in humans and pigs.

Footnotes

References

Literature cited

 
 
 
 
 Borror, Donald J., and White, Richard E. 1970. A Field Guide to the Insects. Boston: Houghton Mifflin.
 
 
 
 
 
 
 
 
 Diaw, O.T. 1976. Contribution a l'etude de nematodes Trichostrongyloidea parasites de xenarthre, marsupiaux et rongeurs neotropicaux. Bulletin de la Muséum National de la Histoire Naturel de Paris (Zoologie) 282:1065-1089.
 
 
 
 Durden, L.A. and Kollars, T.M., Jr. 1997. The fleas (Siphonaptera) of Tennessee. Journal of Vector Ecology 22(1):13-22.
 Durden, L.A. and Musser, G.G. 1994. The sucking lice (Insecta, Anoplura) of the world: a taxonomic checklist with records of mammalian hosts and geographical distributions. Bulletin of the American Museum of Natural History 218:1-90.
 Durden, L.A., Kollars, T.M., Jr., Patton, S. and Gerhardt, R.R. 1997. Sucking lice (Anoplura) of mammals of Tennessee. Journal of Vector Ecology 22(1):71-76.
 Durden, L.A., Wills, W. and Clark, K.L. 1999. The fleas (Siphonaptera) of South Carolina with an assessment of their vectorial importance. Journal of Vector Ecology 24(2):171-181.
 
 Forrester, D.J. 1992. Parasites and diseases of wild mammals in Florida. University of Press of Florida, 459 pp. 
 
 
 
 
 
 
 Kinsella, J.M. 1974. Comparison of helminth parasites of the cotton rat, Sigmodon hispidus, from several habitats in Florida. American Museum Novitates 2540:1-12.
 Kinsella, J.M. 1988. Comparison of helminths of rice rats, Oryzomys palustris, from freshwater and saltwater marshes in Florida. Proceedings of the Helminthological Society of Washington 55(2):275-280.
 
 
 
 Kinsella, J.M. and Tkach, V.V. 2005. Notocotylus fosteri sp. nov. (Trematoda, Notocotylidae) from the rice rat, Oryzomys palustris in Florida. Acta Parasitologica 50(3):194-198.
 
 Kollars, T.M., Jr., Durden, L.A. and Oliver, J.H., Jr. 1997. Fleas and lice parasitizing mammals in Missouri. Journal of Vector Ecology 22(2):125-132.
 
 Kontrimavichus, V.L. 1985. Helminths of mustelids and trends in their evolution. Amerind Publishing Company, 607 pp.
 
 Levin, M., Levine, J.F., Norris, D.E., Howard, P., Yang, S. and Apperson, C.S. 1993. Reservoir competence of rice rat and lizards for the Lyme disease spirochete, Borrelia burgdorferi. Pp. 11-13 in Apperson, C.S., Levine, J.F. and Snoddy, E.L. (eds.). Proceedings of the 2nd Workshop on Lyme Disease in the Southeast. Raleigh: North Carolina State University.
 
 Levine, J.F., Apperson, C.S., Strider, J.B., Jr., Levin, M., Ryan, J.R., Howard, P., Coughlin, W., Knight, M. and Yang, S. 1993. Ticks, their hosts, and Borrelia burgdorferi on the outer banks of North Carolina. Pp. 7-8 in Apperson, C.S., Levine, J.F. and Snoddy, E.L. (eds.). Proceedings of the 2nd Workshop on Lyme Disease in the Southeast. Raleigh: North Carolina State University.
 
 Martin, J.W. and Davis, G.E. 2001. An updated classification of the Recent Crustacea. Natural History Museum of Los Angeles County, Science Series 39:1-124.
 
 
 
 
 
 
 Musser, G.G. and Carleton, M.D. 2005. Superfamily Muroidea. Pp. 894-1531 in Wilson, D.E. and Reeder, D.M. (eds.). Mammal Species of the World: a taxonomic and geographic reference. 3rd ed. Baltimore: The Johns Hopkins University Press, 2 vols., 2142 pp. 
 
 
 
 
 
 
 
 
 
 
 Sonenshine, D.E., Ratzlaff, R., Troyer, J.M., Demmerle, S.M., Demmerle, E., Jenkins, S. and Annis, B. 1993. Tick-host associations and maintenance of Borrelia burgdorferi in Virginia. Pp. 8-9 in Apperson, C.S., Levine, J.F. and Snoddy, E.L. (eds.). Proceedings of the 2nd Workshop on Lyme Disease in the Southeast. Raleigh: North Carolina State University.
 
 
 
 
 Whitaker, J.O. and Hamilton, W.J. 1998. Mammals of the Eastern United States. Cornell University Press, 583 pp. 
 
 
 Williams, D.C., Wills, W., Durden, L.A. and Gray, E.W. 1999. Ticks of South Carolina (Acari: Ixodoidea). Journal of Vector Ecology 24(2):224-232.
 
 Wolfe, J.L. 1982. Oryzomys palustris. Mammalian Species 176:1-5.
 

Oryzomys palustris, parasites of
Parasites of rodents